On the Come Up is a 2022 American musical drama film directed by Sanaa Lathan in her feature directorial debut. Based on the 2019 novel of the same name by Angie Thomas, it stars Jamila C. Gray, Da'Vine Joy Randolph, Mike Epps, Lil Yachty, Lathan, and Method Man.

On the Come Up is produced by Paramount Players, Temple Hill Entertainment and State Street Pictures. The film had its world premiere at the Toronto International Film Festival on September 8, 2022, and was released both in limited theaters and on Paramount+ on September 23, 2022. The film received positive reviews from critics.

Premise 
The film follows 16-year-old Bri Jackson as she sets out to become a rap star.

Cast 
 Jamila C. Gray as Bri Jackson
 Da'Vine Joy Randolph as Pooh
 Mike Epps as Hype
 Lil Yachty as Infamous Millz
 Sanaa Lathan as Jay
 Method Man as Supreme
 Titus Makin Jr. as Trey
 Miles Gutierrez-Riley as Sonny
 Michael Cooper Jr. as Malik
 Justin Martin as Milez
 GaTa as M-Dot

Production 
On February 4, 2019, Fox 2000 Pictures acquired the rights to adapt Angie Thomas's 2019 novel On the Come Up, with George Tillman Jr. set to direct. The film's producers include Thomas and Tillman, alongside Robert Teitel, Jay Marcus from State Street Pictures, and Marty Bowen, Isaac Klausner and John Fischer of Temple Hill Entertainment. On December 11, 2019, after Disney acquisition of 21st Century Fox and closing of Fox 2000, Paramount Players acquired the film adaptation with Kay Oyegun hired to write the script and Tillman Jr. still attached to direct. On October 19, 2020, Wanuri Kahiu replaced Tillman Jr. as director of the film. On June 10, 2021, it was announced that Sanaa Lathan would make her directorial debut with the film, replacing Kahiu. On November 8, 2021, Method Man, Mike Epps, and Da'Vine Joy Randolph were cast in the film.

Music

Release 
The film premiered on September 8 at the 2022 Toronto International Film Festival. It was also announced that the adaptation would be released on September 23, 2022, both in limited theaters and on the streaming service Paramount+.

Reception
The film has an approval rating of 74% based on 31 professional reviews on the review aggregator website Rotten Tomatoes, with an average rating of 6.2/10.

References

External links 

2022 directorial debut films
2022 films
2020s American films
2020s English-language films
2020s musical drama films
Films based on American novels
Films about music and musicians
African-American musical drama films
Paramount+ original films